Perry Central Junior-Senior High School is a public high school located in Leopold, Indiana.

See also
 List of high schools in Indiana

References

External links
 Official Website

Buildings and structures in Perry County, Indiana
Public middle schools in Indiana
Public high schools in Indiana
1962 establishments in Indiana